The Neil Colgan Hut is an alpine hut located at an altitude of  on the Fay Glacier in Kootenay National Park in British Columbia, Canada. It is in a col between Mount Little and Mount Bowlen, one of the peaks overlooking the Valley of the Ten Peaks. The hut is maintained by the Alpine Club of Canada and is the highest permanent structure in Canada. It is named for hiker and adventurer Neil M. Colgan (1953–1979).

The hut can accommodate 18 in the summer and 16 in the winter and is equipped with propane-powered lamps and a stovetop. There is one outdoor drum toilet at the facility.

Reaching the hut from Fay Hut requires approximately 4 to 6 hours of glacier travel, or 8 to 12 hours climbing the Perren Route from Moraine Lake.

Nearby
 Fay Hut
 Valley of the Ten Peaks

Further reading
 Lynn Martel, Tales and Trails: Adventures for Everyone in the Canadian Rockies, P 76, 90, 
 The American Alpine Club Golden, The American Alpine Club Banff, Accidents in North American Mountaineering 2004, P 7
 Andrew Hempstead, Moon Canadian Rockies: Including Banff & Jasper National Parks

References

External links
Neil Colgan Hut at the Alpine Club of Canada

Mountain huts in Canada
Kootenay National Park
Buildings and structures in British Columbia